Dark elf may refer to:

 Dökkálfar or dark elves, a type of elf in Norse mythology.
 Svartálfar or black elves, a type of elf in Norse mythology
 Moriquendi, a fictional race of elves in J. R. R. Tolkien's legendarium
Drow, or dark elves, a fictional subrace of elves in Dungeons & Dragons
The Dark Elf Trilogy, a series of novels by R. A. Salvatore set in the Dungeons & Dragons universe
 Dark Elves, a type of elf in the Warhammer fantasy series
 Drukhari a.k.a. Dark Eldar, their Warhammer 40,000 counterparts
 Dunmer, a type of elf in the Elder Scrolls fantasy series

See also 
 High elf (disambiguation)